Márcio Daniel Ribeiro de Sousa (born 23 March 1986) is a Portuguese professional footballer who plays for «Os Sandinenses» Grupo Desportivo Recreativo e Cultural as an attacking midfielder.

He amassed LigaPro totals of 110 matches and four goals over six seasons, mainly with Tondela (three years). He spent the rest of his career in the lower leagues.

Sousa was a youth international for Portugal, notably winning the European Under-17 Championship.

Club career
Born in the village of Sande (São Clemente) in Guimarães, Sousa moved to FC Porto's youth system at the age of 16 alongside Rabiola and Vieirinha, in a deal that sent Brazilian striker Rafael in the opposite direction. On 17 December 2003, he was called by first-team coach José Mourinho for a Portuguese Cup match against F.C. Maia, but eventually did not leave the bench, subsequently returning to the juniors.

After being released by Porto in June 2007, Sousa played several seasons in the lower divisions of his country. Prior to that, he competed in the second level on loan, with S.C. Covilhã and F.C. Vizela.

In July 2010, Sousa signed for C.D. Tondela, scoring nine times in 32 games in his second year as they promoted to the second tier for the first time ever. He made his league debut with the club on 12 August 2012 in a 2–2 home draw against FC Porto B, and scored his first goal on 23 September to help the hosts defeat Associação Naval 1º de Maio 3–1.

Having been deemed surplus to requirements, Sousa joined S.C. Farense also in that division in the summer of 2015. He found the net in the last matchday against Gil Vicente FC, but the 3–2 away win amounted to nothing as the team finished in 20th position and were relegated.

Until the end of his retirement, Sousa competed exclusively in the lower leagues or amateur football. Early in his career, he earned the nickname Maradona.

International career
Sousa helped Portugal under-17s win their fifth title in the category in the 2003 UEFA European Championship held on home soil, scoring twice – both goals came in the final against Spain. He also helped the team reach the quarter-finals in that year's FIFA World Cup in Finland, netting once.

In 2004, Sousa played for the under-19 side in the 2005 European Championship qualifiers, scoring against Bosnia and Herzegovina, but the country failed to ensure a place in the finals in Northern Ireland.

Club statistics

Honours

Club
Tondela
Segunda Liga: 2014–15

International
Portugal
UEFA European Under-17 Championship: 2003

References

External links

1986 births
Living people
Sportspeople from Guimarães
Portuguese footballers
Association football midfielders
Liga Portugal 2 players
Segunda Divisão players
FC Porto B players
FC Porto players
S.C. Covilhã players
F.C. Vizela players
F.C. Penafiel players
C.D. Tondela players
S.C. Farense players
G.D.R.C. Os Sandinenses players
Portugal youth international footballers